UFC 72: Victory was a mixed martial arts event held by the Ultimate Fighting Championship. The event took place Saturday, 16 June 2007 at The Odyssey in Belfast, Northern Ireland.

Background
UFC 72 continued the UFC's expansion into Europe, as it was the third event to take place in Europe and the United Kingdom after UFC 38 in 2002 (Royal Albert Hall in London, United Kingdom) and UFC 70 in April 2007 (MEN Arena in Manchester, United Kingdom). The card aired on pay-per-view in North America and via Setanta Sports in the United Kingdom and Ireland.

Martin Kampmann was scheduled to fight Rich Franklin, but was forced to withdraw due to injury. Yushin Okami replaced Kampmann in the main event.

Jake O'Brien was scheduled to fight Tom Murphy, but was forced to withdraw due to injury. There was no replacement for O'Brien, and Murphy did not fight on the UFC 72 card.

Results

Bonus awards

The bonuses for this event were $40,000 each.:
Fight of the Night: Clay Guida vs. Tyson Griffin
Knockout of the Night: Marcus Davis
Submission of the Night: Ed Herman

See also
 Ultimate Fighting Championship
 List of UFC champions
 List of UFC events
 2007 in UFC

References

External links
UFC 72 Event Site

Official UFC 72 Fight Card

Ultimate Fighting Championship events
2007 in mixed martial arts
Mixed martial arts in the United Kingdom
Sport in Belfast
2007 in Northern Ireland sport